Havas Media Group is the media division of the global marketing and communications group Havas. It incorporates the media assets of Havas, which includes predominantly entities which were formerly known as Media Planning Group (MPG). MPG was created in March 1999 as the result of a merger between Media Planning founded in 1978, and Médiapolis, founded in 1980. The two agencies offer communication, media strategy and management services to its clients. It operates mainly in Western Europe and the Americas.

History
MPG was created in 1999 as the result of a merger between two media agencies: Media Planning S.A. founded in Spain in 1978 by Leopoldo Rodés Castañes which covered the Hispanic markets, and Médiapolis, a French company founded in 1980 by Havas Advertising. Havas initially acquired a 45% holding in MPG, which increased to 100% in May 2001. Fernando Rodés Vilà, who joined Media Planning S.A in 1994, was appointed Chief Executive Officer of Havas in March 2006. In October 2006, Havas announced that all its media assets would be reorganised under the umbrella of "Havas Media" and Alfonso Rodes Vila, brother of Fernando, was named CEO in July 2006.

In June 2022, Havas Media Group Announced their global partnership with attention firm Lumen Research which will create tools to plan, measure, buy, and optimize attention.

Controversy
In June 2009, Havas Media Group was criticized by the Industrial Workers of the World for firing 11% of their staff and only giving workers a four-week severance package. The union initiated a campaign to get their biggest client, Sears Holdings Corporation, to stop using MPG by protesting outside of Kmart stores. MPG has not publicly commented on the dispute.

References

Advertising agencies of France
Media